The Simila is a right tributary of the river Bârlad in Romania. It discharges into the Bârlad in the village Simila, near the city Bârlad.

References

Rivers of Romania
Rivers of Vaslui County